The 2022 Maryland Cycling Classic was the first edition of the Maryland Cycling Classic. It was held on 4 September 2022 as part of the 2022 UCI ProSeries calendar.

Teams 
4 of the 19 UCI WorldTeams, two UCI ProTeams, nine UCI Continental teams and the American national team made up the 16 teams that participated in the race. In total, 111 riders started the race.

UCI WorldTeams

 
 
 
 

UCI ProTeams

 
 

UCI Continental Teams

 
 
 
 
 
 
 
 
 

National Teams

 United States

Result

References

External links 
 

Maryland Cycling Classic
Maryland Cycling Classic
Maryland Cycling Classic